Home and Away is an Australian soap opera. The following is a list of characters that first appeared in 1998, by order of appearance. They were all introduced by the show's executive producer John Holmes. The 11th season of Home and Away began airing on the Seven Network on 12 January 1998. The first introduction of year was Will Smith, played by Zac Drayson. Several episodes later, the Nash family consisting of parents Joel and Natalie and their children Tom and Gypsy  debuted. April saw the birth of Olivia Fraser Richards. September saw the first appearance of Byron Fisher and in the same month Bec Cartwright took on the role of Will's sister, Hayley. Scott Major guested as armed robber Murray in October. David D'Angelo arrived in November.

Will Smith

Will Smith, played by Zac Drayson, made his first on-screen appearance on 13 February 1998. Will was a regular on the show from 1998 to 2002 and continued to make frequent guest appearances until 2005. In 2010, it was announced that the character and Drayson would be returning to the show. Will returned to the Bay with his daughter on 14 October 2010.  Drayson was originally cast in the role of Tom Nash, but at the last minute the show's producers thought he would be more suited to the "rougher" upcoming role of Will.  The character left Summer Bay after marrying Gypsy Nash (Kimberley Cooper). Drayson made occasional guest appearances in the show from 2003 to 2005. In September 2010, it was announced that Drayson had reprised his role of Will and would be returning to Home and Away. Will was originally described as a "hot-tempered trouble maker" who arrives in the Bay to reconnect with his siblings, Hayley (Rebecca Hewitt) and Nick (Chris Egan). Will learns to calm down and when he decides to leave the Bay he was, by then, considered a "good bloke".

Natalie Nash

Natalie Nash, played by Angelica la Bozzetta, made her first on-screen appearance on 18 February 1998. In 1997, following Debra Lawrance's decision to quit her role as Pippa Ross producers decided to introduce a new family to run the caravan park, because the household was seen as the "centrepieice of the show". They created the Nash family consisting of parents Natalie and Joel Nash, played by la Bozzetta and David Woodley respectively and children Gypsy (Kimberley Cooper) and Tom (Graeme Squires). la Bozetta quit the role in late 1998 to spend more time with her daughter. Antoinette Byron was cast in the role and made her debut in the 1999 season premiere. Channel 5 chose the episode where Natalie and Joel return to Summer Bay with their children, Tom and Gypsy, as one of their best episodes from the last 25 years of the serial.

Joel Nash

Joel Nash, played by David Woodley made his first appearance on 18 February and departed on 11 October 2000. Prior to acting career,  Woodley had worked as a federal police officer in Melbourne.  Before taking on the role of Joel, Woodley previously guested on the serial as Finlay Roberts' (Tina Thomsen) partner Barry, in 1996.

Gypsy Nash

Gypsy Nash, played by Kimberley Cooper, debuted on-screen during the episode airing on 18 February 1998. Gypsy and departed in 2002. She returned on 9 September 2011 and departed on 13 October 2011. In 1997, after Debra Lawrance quit her role as Pippa Ross producers decided to introduce a new family to run the caravan park, because the household was seen as the "centrepiece of the show". They created the Nash family consisting of Gypsy played by Cooper, sibling Tom (Graeme Squires) and their parents Natalie and Joel Nash played by Angelica la Bozzetta and David Woodley respectively. The family come to Summer Bay from Hong Kong to start a new life.  In June 2011, it was announced that Cooper had reprised her role as Gypsy and had returned to filming in May. Cooper confirmed that Gypsy's return would be "dramatic, in true Gypsy style". Gypsy returned with her daughter Lily in September 2011. At the 41st Logie Awards Cooper won the "Most Popular New Female Talent" award for her portrayal of Gypsy, she was the first ever recipient of the award. Gypsy's kidnapping was nominated for "Most Dramatic Storyline" at the 1999 Inside Soap Awards. The following year, Cooper won an award in the "Best Aussie actress" category.  Soap opera reporting website Holy Soap included Gypsy on their list of "Sexiest Home and Away girls ever" list. They also brand her most memorable moments as; "being kidnapped and having a baby with Will Smith".

Tom Nash

Tom Nash, played by Graeme Squires, made his first screen appearance during the episode broadcast on 18 February 1998. Zac Drayson was originally cast in the role, but when the producers thought he would be more suitable for Will Smith, Squires received the part. The actor decided to leave Home and Away in early 2000 after two years Tom departed on 16 May 2000.  and he made his screen exit on 16 May 2000. Squires returned to film the show's 3,000th episode special in 2001.  Zac Drayson was originally cast in the role of Tom, but the producers later thought he would be more suited to the "rougher" role of Will Smith. Squires was then cast as Tom and he revealed that he was honoured to be a part of the Home and Away crew. He told Jason Herbison of All About Soap that the best thing to happen to him was getting the part of Tom. He explained "I had done some modelling before, but Home and Away was definitely my first big acting break. It's what people know me for and I'm very grateful that I was given the role."  A writer for official Home and Away website described Tom as "your typical cricket-in-summer, rugby-in-winter kind of guy; he's sporty, good-looking and a bit of a ladies' man!" When asked if he shared any similarities with his character, Squires stated that they were both creative and liked the outdoors. He added that Tom is more outgoing, while he is much more quieter. For his portrayal of Tom, Squires earned a nomination for Most Popular New Male Talent
at the Logie Awards of 1999. Robin Oliver of The Sydney Morning Herald called Tom and Gypsy "good-looking children". Inside Soap's Steven Murphy said Tom and Terri's relationship was the hottest romance of the lot. Claire Brand and Annette Dasey of the same publication called Tom "the darling of Summer Bay", while Soaplife's Tina Baker branded the character "tasty Tom".

Olivia Fraser Richards

Olivia Fraser Richards made her first appearance on 20 April 1998. The character was born on-screen to Lachlan Fraser (Richard Grieve) and Chloe Richards (Kristy Wright). When she returned to the serial in 2005, Olivia was played by Ivy Latimer. Following Chloe's death, Olivia leaves the Bay with her uncle James (Michael Piccirilli). In October 2015, the character returned to Home and Away with Raechelle Banno in the role. Olivia returns to Summer Bay in the hope that her mother's former foster carer Irene Roberts (Lynne McGranger) will look after her, following some trouble at her school in London. Olivia flirts with VJ Patterson (Matt Little) upon her arrival and Banno commented, "She's very forward. I think she wants his attention and she just puts herself out there."

Hayley Smith

Hayley Smith was portrayed from September 1998 to September 2005 by actress Rebecca Cartwright and from September to November 2005 by Ella Scott Lynch, after Cartwright left the show for personal reasons.
Described by The Sun-Herald as one of the "best-loved characters in Australian drama", Cartwright won the 2005 Logie Award for Most Popular Actress for her portrayal of Smith and was nominated for a Gold Logie the same year. The Sun-Herald described the character of Smith as "trouble-prone" and "an artistic young widow who has overcome a graffiti problem".

Byron Fisher

Byron Fisher, played by a number of child actors, made his first appearance on 16 September 1998 as a vision in his mother Marilyn's (Emily Symons) dream during her pregnancy. Byron was born on 16 February 1999 and was played by Brittany Jones and Joel Sanders-Aguius. Nathanial Davey portrayed an 11-year-old Byron in a vision.

Byron is born to Marilyn and Donald Fisher (Norman Coburn). He is given the middle name Vincent after Vinnie Patterson (Ryan Kwanten) speeds through traffic to get Marilyn to hospital.  Marilyn struggles to connect with Byron and suffers from post-natal depression and walks out on him and Donald. She returns several months later and finds herself feeling pushed out by Byron's nanny, Ellen Porter (Anne Grigg). However, Ellen leaves and Marilyn is able to bond with Byron and the Fishers settle into a relatively normal family life. However, this is cut short when Byron is diagnosed with cancer and the best chance of saving him is to have him treated overseas. Marilyn and Byron then leave for America. Donald sells his Streeton painting in order to raise the money for Byron's treatment and Simon Broadhurst (Morgan O'Neill) buys it but returns it to Donald. Donald prepares to join Marilyn but receives a call with the news Byron has died. Donald flies to America for Byron's funeral service but returns alone after Marilyn runs off again. Donald later writes a book called Letter to Byron and it is illustrated by Hayley Smith (Bec Cartwright).

Byron appears to Marilyn in a dream as an 11 year old when she begins having visions of the late Amber Copeland (Mitzi Ruhlman). Rabbit introduces Marilyn to Byron and he says hello.

Byron's birth was chosen by Channel 5 as one of their "Best Ever" episodes.

Murray

Murray played by Scott Major, made his first appearance on 20 October 1998 and departed on 30 October 1998.

Murray first appears on the beach where he loads his gun and heads towards the Bayside diner.
He orders breakfast and when the time comes to pay, he tells Ailsa Stewart (Judy Nunn) he has no money and offers to help out but she refuses. When Ailsa goes to call the police, Murray locks the door and holds her hostage at gunpoint. Ailsa's husband Alf (Ray Meagher) returns and discovers her held hostage. To get rid of Murray, Ailsa gives him the float from the till and while he is distracted, Alf attempts to hit Murray to retrieve the money with a mallet but is stopped.

Murray prepares to flee but officers Joel Nash (David Woodley) and Terri Garner (Alyson Standen) come in for coffee. After the police leave, He goes to leave with the money but panics when Terri returns and fires a shot which hits Sally Fletcher (Kate Ritchie) in the leg. He then holds the customers at gunpoint and is reluctant to let them help Sally. He then flees and hides out in a cave for several days and is discovered by Sam Marshall (Ryan Clark) and Hayley Smith (Bec Cartwright) who he takes hostage.  Hayley's brother Will (Zac Drayson) and his girlfriend Gypsy Nash (Kimberley Cooper) find them and are also taken hostage. The next morning the teens try to escape while Murray is asleep but they disturb him and he continues to hold him hostage. Will tries to sympathize by telling Murray about his own experiences of being on the streets. Sam and Hayley escape and Gypsy tries to but Murray catches her. Will bargains with Murray to release Gypsy and give himself up. Joel and Constable Barry Dennis (Mark Shaw) arrest him. Murray then appears as a vision in Ailsa's subconscious when she sees a lookalike customer who comes into the diner.

Channel 5 chose Murray's hold-up of the Diner of one of their best episodes ever.

David D'Angelo

David D'Angelo (alias Robert Perez) made his first appearance on 9 November 1998, played by Valentino Arico and then by Ross Pennissi in shadow form, credited as Mr. X. Tony Poli began playing David until the character's departure on 13 October 1999.

David's storyline sees him play out his revenge against Joel Nash (David Woodley) who imprisoned him for 15 years in Hong Kong. He uses Joel's daughter Gypsy (Kimberley Cooper) as a pawn in his plan by posing as her tutor, before kidnapping her. Cooper told the official Home and Away website of her experiences filming with Poli in the storyline: "It was pretty scary. I can't really describe it. It was kind of fun but it was kind of hard." She then told how Poli was "so much fun" and helped her in a lot of situations. "He pointed out a few things and just talked me through it and he gave me a lot of feedback, too. He was really cool." When asked if Poli was anything like his character, Cooper added: "No, not at all. And to watch him do Robert and then see him talking to his son on the phone making baby noises was pretty strange."

David arrives in Summer Bay and secretly records a conversation between Gypsy and Justine Welles (Bree Desborough) and then records a conversation between Gypsy's father, Joel and uncle Travis (Nic Testoni). He assumes the name Robert Perez and begins dating Gypsy. He then moves into the Caravan Park and advertises his services as a Maths Tutor and is hired by Joel and his wife Natalie (Angelica la Bozetta) to help Gypsy improve her grades. David sends a tape of Joel and Travis' conversation where Joel admits he does not want any more kids to Natalie and she is upset. Travis and his wife Rebecca (Belinda Emmett) become suspicious of David when he mentions Joel and Natalie's problems and they alert them. David tells Gypsy about a book sale and takes off with her, in order to kidnap her. Gypsy's brother, Tom (Graeme Squires) and Will Smith (Zac Drayson) break into David's caravan and they discover newspaper cuttings featuring Joel and his return to Summer Bay. It emerges David is a criminal Joel apprehended in Hong Kong. He holds Gypsy hostage for three weeks and sends the Nashes some cryptic clues in the form of recorded poems by Gypsy and crossword puzzles.  He later takes Joel hostage then dumps him in the woods and tells him he has two hours to save his family. David steals Joel's identity and cleans out his bank account and then sets fire to the Nashes house with Natalie (now played by Antoinette Byron), Tom and Gypsy inside. During the blaze, David takes Natalie hostage and Joel apprehends David after Natalie gives clues to her whereabouts via telephone. David is then jailed and Joel visits him to demand his money back but David has the last laugh when he riles him about Gypsy, angering him.

David escapes from prison several months later to retrieve the money he stole, which is buried in the bush but is enraged to discover that Duncan Stewart (Brendan McKensy) and Gazza Boyd (Sebastian Huber) have already found the money. He then threatens to harm Duncan and his mother, Ailsa (Judy Nunn). He orders Duncan to retrieve the money from Gazza and warns him Ailsa will be hurt if he calls the police. David then gags Ailsa and takes Duncan hostage and tries to flee the country with his accomplice Lauren Healy (Merridy Eastman). Joel tracks David down with several officers and the chase culminates in David losing his footing and Joel saves him from a cliff fall. He files a complaint against Joel, alleging that he hit him, bloodying his nose but Joel proves his innocence and David is jailed once more.

Rachel Browne of The Sun-Herald listed David's vendetta among the best television cliffhangers at the close of the 1998 Australian television season. Ahead of the 1999 Season premiere, she described David as a "Hooded Psycho bent on revenge". David's kidnapping of Gypsy and stalking of the Nash family was nominated for "Most Dramatic Storyline" at the 1999 Inside Soap Awards.

Others

References

External links
Characters and cast at the Official AU Home and Away website
Characters and cast at the Official UK Home and Away website
Characters and cast at the Internet Movie Database

, 1998
, H